The National Liberal Party of Cuba (PLNC) was a political party of Cuba, founded in 2004 and dissolved in 2014.

History
The party was founded under the name Cuban Liberal Movement in 2004. It changed its name to PLNC in 2007. Party members were often intimidated, arrested, or imprisoned by political police.

On February 20, 2014, it merged with the Democratic Solidarity Party, adopting the name Cuban Liberal Solidarity Party (PSLC).

Ideology
The National Liberal Party of Cuba was a party of liberal ideology, since it defended postulates like nonintervention of the state and absolute economic freedom. The PLNC struggled to end Cuba's socialist system and respect for human rights. It was open to engaging in a dialogue with all pro-democratic forces in Cuba, especially those of liberal descent.

See also

List of political parties in Cuba
Liberalism
Contributions to liberal theory
Liberalism by country
Liberal democracy
Liberalism in Cuba

References

Defunct political parties in Cuba
Liberal parties in Cuba
Cuban democracy movements
Cuban nationalism
National liberal parties
Political parties established in 2004
Political parties disestablished in 2014
2004 establishments in Cuba
2014 disestablishments in Cuba
Neoliberal parties